Events in the year 1322 in Japan.

Incumbents
Monarch: Go-Daigo

Births
January 11 - Emperor Kōmyō (d. 1380)

References

 
 
Japan
Years of the 14th century in Japan